Acromantis japonica, common name Japanese boxer mantis, is a species of praying mantis found in Japan, Korea, Taiwan, and China. It was described by John Obadiah Westwood in 1889. Acromantis japonica belongs to the family Hymenopodidae and subfamily Acromantinae. No subspecies are listed.

See also
List of mantis genera and species

References

Japonica
Mantodea of Asia
Insects of Japan
Insects of China
Insects of Korea
Insects described in 1889
Taxa named by John O. Westwood